Jesús Andrés Padilla Cisneros (born March 3, 1987 in San Jose, California) is a Mexican-American former soccer player who played as a striker.

Career
Padilla was born and raised in San Jose, California and moved to Guadalajara with his parents when he was fourteen. He joined the youth academy of Guadalajara in 2001 and, having been a part of the academy system for five years, made his professional debut on August 8, 2006 in a 1-0 loss to Deportivo Toluca.

Padilla moved on loan to sister club Chivas USA of Major League Soccer on August 17, 2009. He remained with Chivas USA until the club declined his contract option on March 11, 2011.

In June 2011, he was loaned to CF La Piedad in México. He scored eight goals in twenty-nine matches in Liga de Ascenso.

Padilla remained with Guadalajara for the Apertura of the 2012-13 Liga MX season. He made seven appearances, five of them as a substitute, in addition to a CONCACAF Champions League appearance. He was loaned to Piedad again for the Clasura portion of the season.

Nationality issue
Although he was born in the United States, according to Article 30 of the Mexican Constitution, he was born Mexican as he is the son of Mexicans born in a foreign country. Chivas owner Jorge Vergara's take on the nationality question is simple: "We go by the definition in the Constitution," Vergara says. "Mexican law says that you are a Mexican if you are born outside Mexico and both parents are Mexican."

Career statistics

References

External links
 

1987 births
Living people
C.D. Guadalajara footballers
Chivas USA players
Dorados de Sinaloa footballers
Major League Soccer players
Mexican expatriate footballers
Mexican footballers
American sportspeople of Mexican descent
Liga MX players
American expatriate sportspeople in Mexico
Soccer players from San Jose, California
Association football forwards
Nationality controversies